Bob Taylor (born 11 May 1931) is a former Australian rules footballer who played with Essendon in the Victorian Football League (VFL).

Notes

External links 
		

Essendon Past Players

1931 births
2015 deaths
Australian rules footballers from Melbourne
Essendon Football Club players
People from Essendon, Victoria